Mery or Méry may refer to:

Places
 Méry, section of town Esneux, Belgium
Méry, Chambéry, Savoie department, Auvergne-Rhône-Alpes region, France
Méry-la-Bataille, Oise department, France
Méry-Bissières-en-Auge, Calvados department, Normandy region, France
Méry-Corbon, Calvados department, Normandy region, France
Méry-sur-Cher, Cher department, Centre-Val de Loire region, France
Méry-sur-Marne, Seine-et-Marne department, Île-de-France region, France
Méry-sur-Oise, Val-d'Oise department, Île-de-France, France
Méry-sur-Seine, Aube department, France
Méry-Prémecy, Marne department, France
Saint-Méry, Seine-et-Marne department, Île-de-France region, France

People with the name Mery
Mery (ancient Egyptian name)
Mery (High Priest of Amun) from the time of Amenhotep II (18th Dynasty)
Mery Andrade (born 1975), American basketball player and coach 
Mery Godigna Collet (born 1959), Venezuelan artist, writer, philanthropist and environmental advocate
Mery Valencia de Ortiz (born 1953), also known as "La Señora", former Colombian drug trafficker
Mery Zamora (born 1972), Ecuadorian syndicalist leader, teacher, and politician

People with the name Méry

Given name
Méry Laurent (Anne Rose Suzanne Louviot, 1849-1900), courtesan and muse of several Parisian artists

Surname
Gaston Méry (1866–1909), French author, translator and journalist
Gaston Méry (explorer) (1844–1897), French explorer
Hubert Beuve-Méry (1902–1989), collaborator with Vichy regime at the beginning of World War II
Huon de Méry (fl. 1200–1250), author of Li Tournoiemenz Anticrit 
Jean Méry (1645–1722), French anatomist and surgeon
Joseph Méry (1797–1866), French writer
Rita Méry (born 1984), Hungarian football striker currently playing in the Hungarian First Division for MTK Hungária
Tomáš Méry (born 1990), Slovak professional ice hockey player

See also
Mary (disambiguation)
Turcat-Méry, a French motor manufacturer 1899–1928